Petros Manos ( 7 April 1871 – 4 April 1918) was a Colonel in Hellenic Army. He also competed at the 1912 Summer Olympics.

Ancestry
Petros Manos was born in Athens in 1871, as the youngest son of Major general Thrasyvoulos Manos (1835–1922), a member of the prominent Phanariote Manos family, and Roxane Mavromichalis (1848–1905), member of the distinguished Mavromichalis family of Mani.

Military career
He entered the Hellenic Army Academy and graduated in 1892. He fought in the Cretan uprisings of 1896–1897, and participated in the Macedonian Struggle, leading an armed band in 1904–1907 under the nom de guerre Kapetan Vergos (Καπετάν Βέργος). A royalist during the National Schism, he followed King Constantine I into exile in Switzerland in 1917, and died there on 4 April 1918.

First marriage
From his first marriage with Maria Argyropoulos (1874–1930), Petros is father of Princess Aspasia of Greece and Denmark (1896–1972) who married King Alexander of Greece (1893–1920) and had child who was Princess Alexandra of Greece and Denmark (1921–1993), who later married King Peter II of Yugoslavia (1923–1970) and also had one child Alexander, Crown Prince of Yugoslavia (born 17 July 1945). From this marriage he also had one daughter, Roxanne (born 28 February 1898.), who became wife of an athlete and later industrialist Christos Zalokostas (1894–1975).

Second marriage
After divorcing his first wife, he contracted second marriage with Sophie Tombazis, daughter of Alexandros Tombazis (son of Georgios Tombazis and Princess Eufrosina Mavrocordato) and his cousin Princess Maria Mavrocordato. His second wife Sophie was direct 
patrilineal descendant of Iakovos Tombazis (1782–1829), who was first Admiral of the Hellenic Navy during the Greek War of Independence against the Ottoman Empire. With her he had one daughter Rallou (born in 1915), who was a choreographer, modern dancer and dance teacher.

Olympic games
He was also a professional fencer.  As a member of Greek Olympic team he competed in the individual and team épée events at the 1912 Summer Olympics held in Stockholm, Sweden.

References

External links
 

1871 births
1918 deaths
Greek male fencers
Olympic fencers of Greece
Fencers at the 1912 Summer Olympics
Sportspeople from Athens
Manos family
Greek colonels
Hellenic Army officers
Greek people of the Macedonian Struggle